Srebrna  (German: Klein Königshuld) is a village in the administrative district of Gmina Szumowo, within Zambrów County, Podlaskie Voivodeship, in north-eastern Poland.

The village has a population of 700.

References

Srebrna